Javier 'Javi' Herreros Gorría (born 18 December 1984 in Logroño, La Rioja) is a Spanish former professional footballer who played as a central defender.

External links

1984 births
Living people
Sportspeople from Logroño
Spanish footballers
Footballers from La Rioja (Spain)
Association football defenders
Segunda División players
Segunda División B players
Tercera División players
CA Osasuna B players
Real Murcia Imperial players
Real Murcia players
Córdoba CF players
UD Melilla footballers
Albacete Balompié players
Real Unión footballers
UD Logroñés players
CD Izarra footballers
SD Logroñés players